In Greek mythology, Laestrygon (Ancient Greek: Λαιστρυγών Laistrygon) was the son of Poseidon and possibly of Gaia. He was the father of Telepora or Telepatra, wife of Aeolus, keeper of the winds.

Mythology 
According to one account, the giant cannibal race of the Laistrygonians was said to have borne from Laestrygon in the isle of Ortygia, Italy.

 [The Sons of Boreas pursued the Harpies all the way to Italy:] — and about the steep Fawn mountain and rugged Etna to the isle Ortygia and the people sprung from Laestrygon who was the son of wide-reigning Poseidon. Note 

 References 

 Hesiod, Catalogue of Women from Homeric Hymns, Epic Cycle, Homerica'' translated by Evelyn-White, H G. Loeb Classical Library Volume 57. London: William Heinemann, 1914. Online version at theio.com

Children of Gaia
Children of Poseidon